Diyu is the realm of the dead or "hell" in Chinese mythology. It is loosely based on a combination of the Buddhist concept of Naraka, traditional Chinese beliefs about the afterlife, and a variety of popular expansions and reinterpretations of these two traditions. The concept parallels purgatory in certain Christian denomininations.

Diyu is typically depicted as a subterranean maze with various levels and chambers, to which souls are taken after death to atone for the sins they committed when they were alive. The exact number of levels in Diyu and their associated deities differ between Buddhist and Taoist interpretations. Some speak of three to four "courts"; others mention "Ten Courts of Hell", each of which is ruled by a judge (collectively known as the Ten Yama Kings); other Chinese legends speak of the "Eighteen Levels of Hell". Each court deals with a different aspect of atonement and different punishments; most legends claim that sinners are subjected to gruesome tortures until their "deaths", after which they are restored to their original state for the torture to be repeated.

Alternative names

Conceptions

According to ideas from Taoism, Buddhism and traditional Chinese folk religion, Diyu is a purgatory that serves to punish and renew spirits in preparation for reincarnation. Many deities, whose names and purposes are the subject of conflicting accounts, are associated with Diyu.

Some early Chinese societies speak of people going to Mount Tai, Jiuyuan, Jiuquan or Fengdu after death. At present, Fengdu and the temples on Mount Tai have been rebuilt into tourist attractions, incorporating artistic depictions of hell and the afterlife. Some Chinese folk religion planchette writings, such as the Taiwanese novel Journeys to the Under-World, say that new hells with new punishments are created as the world changes and that there is a City of Innocent Deaths designed to house those who died with grievances that have yet to be redressed.

Other terminology related to Diyu includes:

 Naihe Bridge, "Bridge of Helplessness", a bridge every soul has to cross before being reincarnated, they are said to drink the Mengpo soup (孟婆汤) at Naihe Qiao so they will forget everything in their current lives and prepare for reincarnation.
 Wang Xiang Tai, "Home-Viewing Pavilion", a pavilion every soul passes by on his/her journey to the Underworld. From there, they can see their families and loved ones in the world of the living.
 Youdu, the capital city of Diyu, generally conceived as being similar to a typical Chinese capital city, such as Chang'an, but surrounded by and pervaded with darkness.
 Youguo, "Oil Cauldron", one of the tortures in hell.
 Santu, the "Three Tortures": Fire Torture, Blade Torture, Blood Torture.

Ten Courts of  Yanluo
The concept of the "Ten Courts of Yanluo" began after Chinese folk religion was influenced by Buddhism. In this variation of Chinese mythology,  there are 12,800 hells located under the earth – eight dark hells, eight cold hells and 84,000 miscellaneous hells located at the edge of the universe. All will go to Diyu after death but the period of time one spends in Diyu is not forever – it depends on the severity of the sins one committed. After receiving due punishment, one will eventually be sent for reincarnation.   Diyu is divided into ten courts, each overseen by a Yanwang.   Souls pass from stage to stage at the decision of a different judge.  The "Ten Courts of Yanluo" is also known as the Ten Courts of Yanwang,   Ten Lords of Minggong, Ten Courts of  Yan-jun(), Ten-Lords of Difu ,  and Ten-Lords of Mingfu   .

Eighteen levels of Hell

The concept of the eighteen hells started in the Tang dynasty. The Buddhist text Sutra on Questions about Hell mentioned 134 worlds of hell, but was simplified to the Eighteen Levels of Hell in the Sutra on the Eighteen Hells for convenience. Some literature refers to eighteen types of hells or to eighteen hells for each type of punishment.

Some religious or literature books say that wrongdoers who were not punished when they were alive are punished in the hells after death. Sinners feel pain and agony just like living humans when they are subjected to the tortures listed below. They cannot "die" from the torture because when the ordeal is over, their bodies will be restored to their original states for the torture to be repeated.

The eighteen hells vary from narrative to narrative but some commonly mentioned tortures include: being steamed; being fried in oil cauldrons; being sawed into half; being run over by vehicles; being pounded in a mortar and pestle; being ground in a mill; being crushed by boulders; being made to shed blood by climbing trees or mountains of knives; having sharp objects driven into their bodies; having hooks pierced into their bodies and being hung upside down; drowning in a pool of filthy blood; being left naked in the freezing cold; being set aflame or cast into infernos; being tied naked to a bronze cylinder with a fire lit at its base; being forced to consume boiling liquids; tongue ripping; eye gouging; teeth extraction; heart digging; disembowelment; skinning; being trampled, gored, mauled, eaten, stung, bitten, pecked, etc., by animals.

See also
 Chinese mythological geography
 Naraka (Buddhism), the Buddhist concept of Hell which is related to the Chinese concept of Diyu
 Yama (East Asia), the wrathful deity who rules Hell in Buddhist mythology
 Ksitigarbha, a bodhisattva who vowed never to achieve buddhahood until the hells are emptied
 Maudgalyayana, one of the Buddha's disciples and the protagonist of the Chinese tale Mulian Rescues His Mother
 Meng Po, a deity who serves souls a potion that makes them forget their past lives before they go for reincarnation
 Ox-Head and Horse-Face, hell guards in Chinese mythology
 Heibai Wuchang, hell guards in Chinese mythology
 Ghost Festival, a traditional Buddhist and Taoist festival celebrated in some Asian countries
 Hell money, joss paper designed to resemble banknotes and meant to be burnt as offerings to the dead
 Hell Scroll (Nara National Museum), a Japanese scroll depicting hells, kept at the Nara National Museum
 Journeys to the Under-World, a Taiwanese novel narrating a journey through Diyu

References

External links
 
 

Buddhist mythology
Locations in Chinese mythology
Conceptions of hell
Taoist cosmology
Afterlife places